The Lost City (Spanish:La ciudad perdida or Terrorists in Madrid, Italian:Terroristi a Madrid) is a 1955 Italian-Spanish drama film directed by Margarita Alexandre and Rafael María Torrecilla and starring Cosetta Greco, Fausto Tozzi and María Dolores Pradera. It is an adaptation of La ciudad perdida (1953) by Spanish author Mercedes Formica.

The film's sets were designed by Enrique Alarcón.

Plot 
Rafael, an ex-exiled republican of the Spanish Civil War, returns to his native city after the years and in the company of his fellow maquis (members of the Resistance) with the mission of carrying out an armed action against Franco's regime. But the mission fails and, in his desperate attempt to escape, Rafael kidnaps a beautiful high class woman.

Cast
 Cosetta Greco as María  
 Fausto Tozzi as Rafael  
 María Dolores Pradera as Luisa  
 Félix Dafauce as Comisario  
 Nani Fernández as Sole  
 Manolo Morán as Eliseo  
 Santiago Rivero as Il Capo  
 Alessandro Fersen as Padre de Rafael 
 Emma Baron as Madre de Rafael

References

Bibliography 
 Bentley, Bernard. A Companion to Spanish Cinema. Boydell & Brewer 2008.

External links 
 

1955 drama films
Spanish drama films
Italian drama films
1955 films
1950s Italian-language films
1950s Spanish-language films
Films set in Madrid
Italian black-and-white films
Spanish black-and-white films
1950s Italian films
1950s Spanish films
1950s multilingual films
Italian multilingual films
Spanish multilingual films